The following is a list of languages used in the Junior Eurovision Song Contest since the contest's inception in 2003, which includes the year, country, song and artist through which each language made its debut. There is a rule in place that stipulates that any given song must be sung in one of the national languages of the country it represents. However, it is permissible for a song to contain lyrics in other languages on top of this.

The songs that contained the most languages were the Serbian entry in 2006 and the Albanian entry in 2015, both with eight. The Serbian song, "Učimo strane jezike", actually only contains two lines (found in its chorus) in Serbian, while the rest is sung in the English, French, German, Italian, Spanish, Russian and Japanese languages. Albania's "Dambaje" is sung in Albanian, German, French, Spanish, English, Italian, Slovene, and Turkish, the last of which made its debut in Junior Eurovision. Germany's debut entry in 2020, "Stronger With You" was the first Junior Eurovision entry mostly in German, making them one of the only current participants in Junior Eurovision whose language appeared in the contest before they did.

Brazilian Portuguese, Japanese, Kazakh, Latin, and Welsh have been featured in songs of the Junior contest, but they have never been used in songs of the senior Eurovision Song Contest (although a Japanese mantra was sung during the Azerbaijani entry of the cancelled Eurovision Song Contest in 2020).

Languages

Winners by language

See also 
 List of languages in the Eurovision Song Contest

Notes

Languages
Junior Eurovision